Kukup is a small fishing village in Pontian District, Johor, Malaysia. It is famous for its open-air seafood restaurants built on stilts over the water. Regularly scheduled ferries connect Kukup with Tanjung Balai in Indonesia.

Kukup became more prosperous when the famous Singapore Arab Syed Mohamed bin Ahmed Alsagoff (also known as Nong Chik) obtained the approval of the Sultan of Johor to develop the southwest coast of Johor. Many government organisations were set up there, including a harbour and port. Boats and ships from the north to the south would stop there, loading and unloading cargo, leaving for Singapore or Malacca. Shops were opened and many people went there to settle down. At that point, many people disagreed with the name Kukub on the grounds that it was not a Malay name, so they changed it to Kukup.

Due to its rapid development, Kukup became one of the big towns in Johor. This was due to the coming of Tuan Syed Mohamed Alsagoff who had sought and obtained approval from Sultan Abu Bakar Johor to explore and open up agriculture lands in the southwest Coast of Johor, bordered by Sungai Permas, Sungai Pontian Kechil, Sungai Pontian Besar, and Sungai Jeram Batu. (Sungai in Malay means river.) Kukup was rapidly developed under Constantinople Estate owned by Tuan Syed Mohamed Alsagoff. Because of this, the whole place was named "Kukup District". Kukup District was replaced with "Pontian District" when the main road linking Pontian and Johor Bahru was completed in 1900. At that time all the government organisations in Kukup were shifted to Pontian. While developing the Kukup area, Tuan Syed Mohamed Alsagoff even issued his own currency.

Transportation
The village is served by TransJohor public buses linking to Pontian Kechil.

References

External links 

 Getting to Kukup
 Kukup Food Guide
 Kukup Resort

Pontian District
Villages in Johor